Celenna centraria is a moth of the family Geometridae first described by Snellen in 1880. It is found in Sumatra and Borneo.

External links

Hypochrosini